Polan (also Romanized as Polān; also known as Dasht-e yārī, Dashtīāri, Mīr Bāzār, and Miri Bazār) is a city in Polan District, Chabahar County, Sistan and Baluchestan province, Iran. At the 2006 census, its population was 1,002, in 199 families. At the 2016 census, its population had risen to 1,044.

References 

Populated places in Chabahar County